Zdeněk Pospíšil (20 August 1924 – 17 May 2009) was a Czech sprinter. He competed in the men's 100 metres at the 1952 Summer Olympics.

References

1924 births
2009 deaths
Athletes (track and field) at the 1952 Summer Olympics
Czech male sprinters
Olympic athletes of Czechoslovakia
Place of birth missing